In mathematics, the Hadwiger–Finsler inequality is a result on the geometry of triangles in the Euclidean plane. It states that if a triangle in the plane has side lengths a, b and c and area T, then

Related inequalities
 Weitzenböck's inequality is a straightforward corollary of the Hadwiger–Finsler inequality: if a triangle in the plane has side lengths a, b and c and area T, then

Hadwiger–Finsler inequality is actually equivalent to Weitzenböck's inequality. Applying (W) to the circummidarc triangle gives (HF)

Weitzenböck's inequality can also be proved using Heron's formula, by which route it can be seen that equality holds in (W) if and only if the triangle is an equilateral triangle, i.e. a = b = c.

 A version for quadrilateral: Let ABCD be a convex quadrilateral with the lengths a, b, c, d and the area T then:

 with equality only for a square. 
Where

Proof
From the cosines law we have: 

α being the angle between b and c. This can be transformed into: 

Since A=1/2bcsinα we have: 

Now remember that 

and 

Using this we get: 

Doing this for all sides of the triangle and adding up we get: 

β and γ being the other angles of the triangle. Now since the halves of the triangle’s angles are less than π/2 the function tan is convex we have: 
 	

Using this we get: 

This is the Hadwiger-Finsler inequality.

History
The Hadwiger–Finsler inequality is named after , who also published in the same paper the Finsler–Hadwiger theorem on a square derived from two other squares that share a vertex.

See also
List of triangle inequalities
Isoperimetric inequality

References

Claudi Alsina, Roger B. Nelsen: When Less is More: Visualizing Basic Inequalities. MAA, 2009, pp. 84-86

External links
 
 

Triangle inequalities